These are the international rankings of Bahrain.

International rankings

Freedom

Political Freedom

Scores are on a 1 to 7 scale, 1 being best.

Freedom in the World is a yearly survey and report by U.S.-based Freedom House that attempts to measure the degree of democracy and political freedom in every nation and significant disputed territories around the world.

Bahrain net change in aggregate score declined by more than 4 points. From 2008 to 2012 Bahrain net change in aggregate score declined by 17 points, making it the fourth country declining globally in that period.

Trade Freedom

Press Freedom

Freedom House

Scores are on a 0 to 100 scale, 0 being best.

Freedom of the Press is a yearly report by US-based non-governmental organization Freedom House, measuring the level of freedom and editorial independence enjoyed by the press in every nation and significant disputed territories around the world. Levels of freedom are scored on a scale from 1 (most free) to 100 (least free). Depending on the ratings, the nations are then classified as "Free", "Partly Free", or "Not Free".

Reporters Without Borders

Scores are on a -10 to 142 scale, -10 being best (most free press).

The Press Freedom Index is an annual ranking of countries compiled and published by Reporters Without Borders based upon the organization's assessment of their press freedom records.

Economic Freedom

Fraser Institute

The Heritage Foundation/The Wall Street Journal

Corruption

Scores are on a 0-10 scale, 10 being best (least corrupt / bribery least necessary).

Rights

Democracy Index

The Democracy Index is an index compiled by the Economist Intelligence Unit that measures the state of democracy in 167 countries, of which 166 are sovereign states and 165 are UN member states. The Economist Intelligence Unit's Democracy Index is based on 60 indicators grouped in five different categories: electoral process and pluralism, civil liberties, functioning of government, political participation and political culture. The Index was first produced in 2006, with updates produced in 2008, 2010 and 2011.

Property rights

Other

Global Peace Index

Human Development Index

Freedom on the Net

Scores are on a 0 to 100 scale, 0 being best.

Freedom on the Net is a yearly survey and report by U.S.-based Freedom House.

References 

Bahrain